Cate House may refer to:

Cate House (Hammond, Louisiana), listed on the National Register of Historic Places in Tangipahoa Parish, Louisiana
Cate House (Castine, Maine), listed on the National Register of Historic Places in Hancock County, Maine
Asa F. Cate Farm Ensemble, McMinnville, Oregon, listed on the National Register of Historic Places in Yamhill County, Oregon
Elijah Cate House, Niota, Tennessee, listed on the National Register of Historic Places in McMinn County, Tennessee